Rong'an County is under the administration of Liuzhou, Guangxi Zhuang Autonomous Region, China. It borders the prefecture-level city of Guilin to the east.

Climate

References 

Counties of Guangxi
Liuzhou